118 118 is a telephone number used by two major directory enquiries providers:
118 118 (UK), owned by The Number UK Ltd
118 118 (Sweden), owned by Eniro AB